Over and Out is a combination of the Procedure words OVER and OUT.

Albums
 Over and Out (Tar album)
 Over and Out (Rick Parfitt album)

Songs
 "Over and Out", by Foo Fighters from their album In Your Honor
 "Over and Out", by Pantera from their 1988 album Power Metal
 "Over and Out", by We Are Scientists from their 2002 album Safety, Fun, and Learning (In That Order)
 "Over and Out", by Alkaline Trio from their 2008 album Agony & Irony
 "Over and Out", by Newton Faulkner from the 2008 album Rebuilt by Humans
 "Over and Out", by Westlife from the 2011 album Greatest Hits
 "Over & Out", by Lucyfire from their 2001 album This Dollar Saved My Life at Whitehorse
 "Over & Out", by Nuno Bettencourt from his album Mourning Widows
 "Over and Out", by 5 Seconds of Summer, the B-side to their single "She's Kinda Hot"
 "Over and Out", by Nine Inch Nails from the 2018 album Bad Witch